Holy Trinity Church, Milford is a former Grade II listed parish church in the Church of England situated in Milford, Derbyshire.

History
The architect was William Bonython Moffatt and the contractor was Mr. Thompson of Derby. The church was consecrated by the Bishop of Lichfield on 26 July 1848. The church was extended in 1909 to the south-east, forming a vestry and church room to the designs of Hunter and Woodhouse of Belper.

Organ
This was sold to Australia in 1994 and replaced by an older instrument dating from 1874 by J.M. Grunwell which had previously been in Belper Baptist Church. A specification of the organ can be found on the National Pipe Organ Register.

Closure
The high cost of upkeep of the church led to a decision being made in 2021 to cease using it for services. The final service was held on 26 September of that year.

See also
 Listed buildings in Belper

References

Church of England church buildings in Derbyshire
Grade II listed churches in Derbyshire